Whitehead Pond, known today as Lime Lake, is a man-made  fresh water pond originally built as a stormwater pond to reduce flooding in the surrounding area. The pond lies at the easternmost edge of 22nd Street in Sarasota, Florida. The pond and its surrounding acreage was originally purchased by Wilmon Whitehead after he returned from World War II in 1947, where he raised his family.

Wilmon Whitehead eventually sold the pond and many other acres to Sarasota County. The county redeveloped much of the land, built a school, and made the pond and surrounding area into a county owned park known as Lime Lake Park. The Whitehead family still owns much of the land that wraps around Lime Lake. The original home that Wilmon Whitehead built still sits on the shore of the lake.

References

Artificial lakes of the United States
Reservoirs in Florida
Lakes of Sarasota County, Florida
Sarasota, Florida